The 2022 Nigerian House of Representatives elections are called to fill vacant seats in the House of Representatives.

Background 
The 360 members of the House of Representatives are elected from single-seat constituencies using first-past-the-post voting; when vacancies occur, by-elections (or bye-elections) are called, scheduled, and administered by the Independent National Electoral Commission. New elections are also called if the general election was annulled by a court or election tribunal with these elections being referred to as supplementary elections if the election is only held in certain polling units and as rerun elections if the election held throughout the entire constituency.

Elections

Summary

Akure North/Akure South Federal Constituency by-election 
On 16 August 2021, member for Akure North/Akure South Adedayo Omolafe (PDP) died from an undisclosed illness. In December 2021, INEC stated its intent to use the Bimodal Voter Accreditation System (BVAS) technology for the by-election along with having polling unit workers upload results directly to the INEC results portal on Election Day. In January, INEC set the date for the by-election for 26 February alongside five other by-elections, with party primaries taking place between 26 January and 5 February.

Primary elections 

The APC conducted an indirect primary on 1 February to nominate one of eight cleared candidates. Mayokun Lawson-Alade emerged as the nominee with over 43% of the vote, defeating former Ondo State Commissioner for Women Affairs Omowunmi Olatunji-Ohwovoriole and former Ondo State House of Assembly member Ademola Adegoroye.

The PDP conducted an indirect primary on 3 February to nominate one of five cleared candidates. Olumuyiwa Adu emerged as the nominee with 42% of the vote, defeating former Ondo State House of Assembly member Kemisola Adesanya.

General election 
Ahead of the by-election, the campaigns of both APC nominee Mayokun Lawson-Alade and PDP nominee Olumuyiwa Adu were optimistic, with Adu hoping to be buoyed by the late Omolafe's popularity in the constituency. Observers noted that despite the areas being a PDP stronghold, the race was shaping up to be competitive and close.

Security-wise, the pre-election situation was described as peacefully normal and that peace continued in most units on election day; however, there was a report of a voter being assaulted in one unit along with a number of vote buying accusations notably including a claim that Ondo State Deputy Governor Lucky Aiyedatiwa (APC) personally went to a unit to organize a vote buying operation. On the other hand, INEC was commended for the timely opening of units and functioning BVAS machines.

After the votes were counted, Lawson-Alade was announced as victor after results showed him defeating Adu by about 2,000 votes, 51% to 47%; the election had 14.41% turnout. Anonymous PDP sources blamed poor campaigning for the loss of the stronghold constituency while Ondo APC Chairman, Ade Adetimehin, cited the party's strategy and governing performance.

Jos North/Bassa Federal Constituency by-election 
On 2 April 2021, member for Jos North/Bassa Haruna Maitala (APC) died in a car crash. In December 2021, INEC stated its intent to use the Bimodal Voter Accreditation System (BVAS) technology for the by-election along with having polling unit workers upload results directly to the INEC results portal on Election Day. In January, INEC set the date for the by-election for 26 February alongside five other by-elections, with party primaries taking place between 26 January and 5 February.

Primary elections 

The APC scheduled its primary for 1 February, however, the process did not begin until the early morning of 2 February to nominate one of four cleared candidates. The primary was marred by mass vote-buying by the surrogates of several candidates. Later on 2 February, the party declared the primary inconclusive after both former Plateau State Commerce Commissioner Joseph Abbey Aku and former member for Jos North/Bassa Suleiman Yahaya Kwande obtained 344 votes. However, both Aku and Yahaya Kwande rejected the announced results and declared victory; the primary election panel consulted with the national party before deciding to hold a rerun primary.

The rerun primary was scheduled for 4 February, however, only Aku participated as Yahaya Kwande petitioned the national APC claiming that he had won the original primary election. The rerun ended with Aku winning overwhelmingly with 809 of 883 votes while Yahaya Kwande received only 74 votes.

The PDP conducted a primary on 3 February to nominate one of its cleared candidates. Musa Agah, a Plateau State House of Assembly member for Irigwe/Rukuba, emerged as the nominee with 54% of the vote, defeating 2019 PDP nominee Jonathan Dabo.

General election 
In the days before the election, observers noted that the race was shaping up to have three major candidates: APC nominee Joseph Abbey Aku, PDP nominee Musa Agah Avia, and PRP nominee Muhammad Adamu Alkali. Analysts also observed regional dynamics as providing issues for the major party nominees and an opening for Alkali as both Aku and Agah Avia are Christians from Bassa LGA which could’ve lead to potential vote splitting to the benefit of Alkali, a Muslim from Jos North LGA. Another potential benefit for Alkali were the contentious APC primaries which allowed him to reach out to aggrieved APC members.

On Election Day, INEC was commended for the timely opening of units and functioning BVAS machines but voters noted low turnout of the electorate. When results were tabulated and announced, Agah Avia emerged the winner as he beat first runner-up Alkali by under 3,000 votes with a turnout of 18.07%. Reactions from the PDP claimed the result was a sign of the party's good prospects for 2023 in Plateau while the PRP party agent refused to sign the election final result sheet, alleging that there were irregularities at the Tudun Wada/Kabon collation centre. In the weeks after the election, pundits argued over if the PRP share was simply a protest vote in the wake of contested APC primaries or a sign of wider disdain for the Plateau APC.

On September 2, the Tribunal sacked Avia and declared Alkali the victor after the PRP presented evidence of overvoting. In late October, a Court of Appeal judgment upheld the Tribunal's ruling and ordered Alkali to be seated due to both overvoting in the general election and improprieties in the PDP nomination process. Alkali was sworn in on 14 November 2022.

Ogoja/Yala Federal Constituency by-election 
On 22 September 2021, member for Ogoja/Yala Agom Jarigbe (PDP) resigned after being sworn in as Senator for Cross River North. In December 2021, INEC stated its intent to use the Bimodal Voter Accreditation System (BVAS) technology for the by-election along with having polling unit workers upload results directly to the INEC results portal on Election Day. In January, INEC set the date for the by-election for 26 February alongside five other by-elections, with party primaries taking place between 26 January and 5 February.

Primary elections 

The APC conducted a primary on 1 February to pick a nominee. The consensus nominee became Jude Ngaji, a former aide to governors Liyel Imoke and Benedict Ayade, who ran unopposed. Prior to the primary, the party prevented candidates from purchasing nomination forms as it attempted to reach consensus leading to accusations of imposition from candidates.

The PDP conducted a primary on 3 February to nominate one of its cleared candidates. Mike Usibe, a former Cross River State commissioner, emerged as the nominee with nearly 80% of the vote, defeating barrister Godwin Offiono.

General election 
In the days before the election, observers noted a contentious atmosphere as the two major parties traded accusations of planned manipulation and fears of violence rose. Both parties strove to win the election as it (along with the Akpabuyo State Constituency by-election) was one of the first elections in Cross River State since Governor Benedict Ayade defected to the APC in May 2021 and thus a powerful signal for the path the state is taking ahead of the 2023 elections.

On the day of the election, allegations of manipulation were quickly leveled with Ogoja Local Government Chairman Emmanuel Ishabor (APC) being accused of leading security agents to briefly disrupt voting and personally assaulting a young voter along with a video of Ayade aide Jimmy Bajie supposedly stealing ballot boxes; although he claimed to simply have been helping INEC officials carry the boxes. Feared violence also transpired as the convey of former member, now-Senator, Jarigbe was attacked by gunmen in Ogoja after the attackers had stolen several results sheets; luckily, no one was injured in the attack and INEC officials had already recorded the results on some of the stolen sheets.

Despite the violence and disruptions, INEC announced the full results with Jude Ngaji of the APC winning by about 2,000 votes over Mike Usibe of the PDP; the election's turnout was 23.69%. Almost immediately, the PDP rejected the declared results and stated its intention to challenge the election.

See also 
 2022 Nigerian state legislative elections

References 

House by-elections
2022 House